Peace be upon you may refer to:

Shalom aleichem (Judaism)
As-salamu alaykum (Islam)

See also
Pax (liturgy) (Christianity)